Ronald Rauhe (born 3 October 1981) is a German sprint canoeist who has competed since 1997. Competing in six Summer Olympics, he won a complete set of medals in the K-2 500 m event (gold: 2004, silver: 2008, bronze: 2000). Rauhe has won 16 world championship gold medals, the most by a male kayaker; now with 26 World medals, in 2011 he exceeded the 20 of his compatriot, Torsten Gutsche.

Early career
Rauhe was selected for the 1997 World Junior Championships in Lahti, Finland at the age of just fifteen years nine months. Competing against paddlers up to three years older he won two medals – gold in the K-4 500 m and silver in the K-1 500 m, an unprecedented achievement for a fifteen-year-old. After winning three more gold medals at the next edition of the world junior championships in Zagreb, Croatia, in 1999 he stepped up to the senior German national team.

Senior career
At the age of seventeen, he enjoyed immediate success, taking the bronze medal in the men's K-1 200 m World Championship final the same year.

Since 2000, the Rauhe/Wieskötter partnership has enjoyed unrivalled success, winning the major K-2 500 m race from 2001 to 2007 (six world titles and the 2004 Olympic gold). The pair have also won eight straight European championships over 500 m (2000–2008; there was no championship in 2003).

Rauhe also dominated the K-1 200 m individual sprint, winning three consecutive golds in both the world and European championships before losing out to Spain's Carlos Pérez in 2005.

If Rauhe's rivals hoped this marked the beginning of a decline in the German's fortunes they were to be disappointed. In 2006 Rauhe was back on top form and won more titles than ever before. At the European Championships in Račice, Czech Republic he won three gold medals, retaining his K-2 500 m title, regaining the K-1 200 m crown from Pérez and winning the K-2 200 m for the first time in his career.

These three victories were repeated at the World Championships in Szeged, Hungary. Rauhe's dominance was best illustrated by his victory in the K-2 200 m final in a race that was scheduled just twenty minutes after his K-1 final (and against a field of rested opponents none of whom had competed in the earlier race).

At the World Championships in his home country Germany in 2007, he and his partner Tim Wieskötter won again the K-2 500 m and came second in the K-2 200 m.

On the national level, he has won 50 national titles at the German Championships. His 50th title was the 500 m in the K-1 on 2 May 2009 in Duisburg.

In June 2015, he competed in the inaugural European Games, for Germany in canoe sprint, more specifically, Men's K-2 200m with Tom Liebscher. He earned a silver medal.

At the 2016 Summer Olympics, he won the bronze medal in the K-1 200 metres event, recording the same time (to a thousandth of a second) as Saúl Craviotto – wiping out the memory of his greatest competitive disappointment, finishing last in the final heat of this event four years previously at the London Olympics.

References

External links
 

1981 births
Living people
Canoeists at the 2000 Summer Olympics
Canoeists at the 2004 Summer Olympics
Canoeists at the 2008 Summer Olympics
Canoeists at the 2012 Summer Olympics
Canoeists at the 2016 Summer Olympics
Canoeists at the 2020 Summer Olympics
German male canoeists
Olympic canoeists of Germany
Olympic gold medalists for Germany
Olympic silver medalists for Germany
Olympic bronze medalists for Germany
Canoeists from Berlin
Olympic medalists in canoeing
ICF Canoe Sprint World Championships medalists in kayak
Medalists at the 2000 Summer Olympics
Medalists at the 2004 Summer Olympics
Medalists at the 2008 Summer Olympics
Medalists at the 2012 Summer Olympics
Medalists at the 2020 Summer Olympics
European Games medalists in canoeing
Canoeists at the 2015 European Games
European Games silver medalists for Germany
Canoeists at the 2019 European Games